Michael Howard Finley (born March 6, 1973) is an American former professional basketball player who is the Vice President of Basketball Operations for the Dallas Mavericks of the National Basketball Association (NBA). He played 15 seasons in the NBA, predominantly with the Mavericks, but also for the Phoenix Suns (who drafted him in 1995), the San Antonio Spurs, and the Boston Celtics. He was a two-time NBA All-Star and won an NBA championship with the Spurs in 2007.

High school career
Finley attended Proviso East High School in Maywood, Illinois, graduating in 1991. In Finley's senior season, Proviso East won the 1991 IHSA class AA boys basketball tournament, and Finley was named to the all-tournament team. Finley's teammates, known collectively as the "Three Amigos", included future NBA draftees Sherrell Ford and Donnie Boyce.

In 2007, Finley was voted one of the "100 Legends of the IHSA Boys Basketball Tournament".

College career
The 6' 7" shooting guard/small forward was originally drafted out of University of Wisconsin–Madison by the Phoenix Suns as the 21st overall pick of the 1995 NBA draft. Finley held the all-time scoring record at Wisconsin for eleven years before being passed by Alando Tucker on March 10, 2007.

College statistics

|-
| style="text-align:left;"|1991–92
| style="text-align:left;"|Wisconsin
| 31 || 28 || 29.7 || .453 || .361 || .742 || 4.9 || 2.7 || .9 || .8 || 12.3
|-
| style="text-align:left;"|1992–93
| style="text-align:left;"|Wisconsin
| 28 || 28 || 35.0 || .467 || .364 || .771 || 5.8 || 3.1 || 1.8 || .6 || 22.1
|-
| style="text-align:left;"|1993–94
| style="text-align:left;"|Wisconsin
| 29 || 29 || 36.1 || .466 || .363 || .786 || 6.7|| 3.2 || 1.4 || .7 || 20.4
|-
| style="text-align:left;"|1994–95
| style="text-align:left;"|Wisconsin
| 27 || 27 || 37.0 || .379 || .284 || .773 || 5.2 || 4.0 || 1.9 || .6 || 20.5
|- class="sortbottom"
| style="text-align:center;" colspan="2"|Career
| 115 || 112 || 34.3 || .440 || .338 || .769 || 5.6 || 3.2 || 1.5 || .7 || 18.7

NBA career

Phoenix Suns (1995–1996)
Finley was named to the 1995–96 NBA All-Rookie First Team and finished third in Rookie of the Year voting after averaging fifteen points, 4.6 rebounds and 3.5 assists per game. He became only the third rookie in Suns history to score over 1,000 points in a season. Despite playing all 82 games in his rookie season, Finley was injured on the final day of regular season and did not play in the playoffs. He was traded by the Suns on December 26, 1996 to the Dallas Mavericks along with Sam Cassell, A. C. Green and a second-round draft pick for Jason Kidd, Tony Dumas and Loren Meyer.

Dallas Mavericks (1996–2005)
In his first season with the Mavericks, Finley led the team in scoring, assists and steals. Along with point guard Steve Nash and forward Dirk Nowitzki, he became an integral part of the Mavericks' late '90s "run and gun" offense.

In 2000, he was selected to represent the Western Conference in the 2000 All-Star Game, in which he scored eleven points. On January 23, 2001, Finley tied an NBA record by recording eight steals in one half of a game. In 2001, he was again selected to represent the Western Conference on All-Star weekend. He played for the US national team in the 2002 FIBA World Championship, which lost a record-three games and failed to win a championship for the first time in a major competition since FIBA opened international competitions to NBA players.

While Finley began to play more of a supporting role (small forward) as he aged and teammate Dirk Nowitzki blossomed, he remained a clutch player for the Mavericks. In 2005, he was waived by Dallas to avoid luxury taxes (as part of the league's new labor agreement). Finley became an unrestricted free agent and after being pursued by Detroit, Miami, Minnesota, and Phoenix, he elected to remain in Texas with the San Antonio Spurs.

San Antonio Spurs (2005–2010)
In San Antonio, Finley adapted well to a secondary role as Manu Ginóbili's backup, developing and emphasizing his outside shooting. The Spurs were knocked out of the 2006 NBA playoffs by his former team one year after he made the switch. During the series, Finley was punched below the belt by former teammate Jason Terry during Game 5, which earned Terry a suspension for the next game of the series and the suspension decision irritated Cuban, the Mavericks' boss, but the Spurs lost Game 7 after an overtime.

In the fifth and final game of San Antonio's first-round series against Denver in 2007, Finley set the Spurs' record for three-point field goals in a playoff game, making eight of nine attempts. He eclipsed the previous record of seven set by teammate Bruce Bowen in 2003. Finley won his only NBA championship in 2007 with the San Antonio Spurs in his 12th NBA season.

At Finley's request, the Spurs bought out the final year of his contract and waived him on March 1, 2010, freeing him to sign with another team.

Boston Celtics (2010)
On March 4, 2010, Finley reached a verbal agreement with the Boston Celtics to join the team for the remainder of the 2009–10 season. He signed with the Celtics on March 6, 2010. The Celtics would reach the 2010 NBA Finals, but would lose to the defending champion Los Angeles Lakers in seven games. At the end of the season, Finley announced he would retire.

Personal life
Finley began playing basketball in elementary school. His favorite player was Michael Jordan and he would occasionally go to Chicago Bulls games. He majored in business management at Wisconsin. Finley attended the same high school as current Philadelphia 76ers head coach Doc Rivers.

Other work

Basketball 
He works in the front office as the Vice President of Basketball Operations for the Dallas Mavericks.

Film 
Finley was one of the producers of the films Lee Daniels' The Butler and The Birth of a Nation.

NBA career statistics

Regular season 

|-
| align="left" | 
| align="left" | Phoenix
| 82 || 72 || 39.2 || .476 || .328 || .749 || 4.6 || 3.5 || 1.0 || .4 || 15.0
|-
| align="left" | 
| align="left" | Phoenix
| 27 || 18 || 29.5 || .475 || .255 || .812 || 4.4 || 2.5 || .7 || .1 || 13.0
|-
| align="left" | 
| align="left" | Dallas
| 56 || 36 || 35.6 || .432 || .387 || .807 || 4.5 || 2.8 || .9 || .4 || 16.0
|-
| align="left" | 
| align="left" | Dallas
| 82 || 82 || style="background:#cfecec;"| 41.4* || .449 || .357 || .784 || 5.3 || 4.9 || 1.6 || .4 || 21.5
|-
| align="left" | 
| align="left" | Dallas
| 50 || 50 || 41.0 || .444 || .331 || .823 || 5.3 || 4.4 || 1.3 || .3 || 20.2
|-
| align="left" | 
| align="left" | Dallas
| 82 || 82 || 42.2 || .457 || .401 || .820 || 6.3 || 5.3 || 1.3 || .4 || 22.6
|-
| align="left" | 
| align="left" | Dallas
| 82 || 82 || style="background:#cfecec;"| 42.0* || .458 || .346 || .775 || 5.2 || 4.4 || 1.4 || .4 || 21.5
|-
| align="left" | 
| align="left" | Dallas
| 69 || 69 || style="background:#cfecec;"| 39.9* || .463 || .339 || .837 || 5.2 || 3.3 || .9 || .4 || 20.6
|-
| align="left" | 
| align="left" | Dallas
| 69 || 69 || 38.3 || .425 || .370 || .861 || 5.8 || 3.0 || 1.1 || .3 || 19.3
|-
| align="left" | 
| align="left" | Dallas
| 72 || 72 || 38.6 || .443 || .405 || .850 || 4.5 || 2.9 || 1.2 || .5 || 18.6
|-
| align="left" | 
| align="left" | Dallas
| 64 || 64 || 36.8 || .427 || .407 || .831 || 4.1 || 2.6 || .8 || .3 || 15.7
|-
| align="left" | 
| align="left" | San Antonio
| 77 || 18 || 26.5 || .412 || .394 || .852 || 3.2 || 1.5 || .5 || .1 || 10.1
|-
|style="text-align:left;background:#afe6ba;"|†
| align="left" | San Antonio
| 82 || 16 || 22.2 || .412 || .364 || .918 || 2.7 || 1.3 || .4 || .2 || 9.0
|-
| align="left" | 
| align="left" | San Antonio
| 82 || 61 || 26.9 || .414 || .370 || .800 || 3.1 || 1.4 || .4 || .1 || 10.1
|-
| align="left" | 
| align="left" | San Antonio
| 81 || 77 || 28.8 || .437 || .411 || .823 || 3.3 || 1.4 || .5 || .2 || 9.7
|-
| align="left" | 
| align="left" | San Antonio
| 25 || 6 || 15.8 || .381 || .317 || .667 || 1.5 || 0.8 || .2 || .2 || 3.7
|-
| align="left" | 
| align="left" | Boston
| 21 || 1 || 15.0 || .506 || .463 || .333 || 1.6 || 1.1 || .2 || .1 || 5.2
|- class="sortbottom"
| style="text-align:center;" colspan="2"| Career
| 1103 || 875 || 34.5 || .440 || .390 || .813 || 4.1 || 2.9 || .9 || .3 || 15.7
|- class="sortbottom"
| style="text-align:center;" colspan="2"| All-Star
| 2 || 0 || 14.5 || .476 || .250 || 1,000 || 2.0 || 2.5 || .0 || .0 || 11.5

Playoffs 

|-
| align="left" | 2001
| align="left" | Dallas
| 10 || 10 || 43.4 || .360 || .362 || .818 || 5.3 || 4.4 || 1.2 || .2 || 19.7
|-
| align="left" | 2002
| align="left" | Dallas
| 8 || 8 || 46.6 || .466 || .378 || .900 || 6.3 || 2.3 || 1.5 || .5 || 24.6
|-
| align="left" | 2003
| align="left" | Dallas
| 20 || 20 || 41.1 || .435 || .412 || .864 || 5.8 || 3.0 || 1.3 || .6 || 18.3
|-
| align="left" | 2004
| align="left" | Dallas
| 5 || 5 || 39.9
 || .382 || .269 || .600 || 3.2 || 2.6 || .8 || .6 || 13.0
|-
| align="left" | 2005
| align="left" | Dallas
| 13 || 13 || 37.8 || .425 || .393 || .889 || 4.3 || 2.2 || 1.3 || .0 || 13.1
|-
| align="left" | 2006
| align="left" | San Antonio
| 13 || 4 || 31.6 || .476 || .383 || .900 || 3.8 || 1.4 || .6 || .2 || 10.5
|-
|style="text-align:left;background:#afe6ba;"|2007†
| align="left" | San Antonio
| 20 || 20 || 26.9 || .410 || .419 || .897 || 2.9 || 1.1 || .6 || .2 || 11.3
|-
| align="left" | 2008
| align="left" | San Antonio
| 17 || 11 || 23.0 || .402 || .365 || 1.000 || 1.9 || 1.0 || .3 || .2 || 6.7
|-
| align="left" | 2009
| align="left" | San Antonio
| 5 || 5 || 28.6 || .441 || .467 || .750 || 3.0 || 1.0 || .2 || .2 || 8.0
|-
| align="left" | 2010
| align="left" | Boston
| 18 || 0 || 6.0 || .250 || .273 || 1.000 || .6 || .2 || .2 || .0 || .8
|- class="sortbottom"
| style="text-align:center;" colspan="2"| Career
| 129 || 96 || 30.3 || .418 || .388 || .866 || 3.5 || 1.8 || .8 || .2 || 11.8

Finals

|- style="text-align: Center;"
|style="text-align:left;background:#afe6ba;"| 2007†
| style="text-align:left;"| San Antonio
| 4 || 4 || 18.5 || .261 || .083 || .667 || 2.0 || .8 || 1.3 ||| .0 || 3.8
|- style="text-align: Center;"
| style="text-align:left;"| 2010
| style="text-align:left;"| Boston
| 2 || 0 || 2.5 || .000 || .000 || .000 || .0 || .0 || .0 ||| .0 || .0
|- class="sortbottom"
| style="text-align:center;" colspan="2"| Career
| 6 || 4 || 13.2 || .250 || .077 || .667 || 1.3 || .5 || .7 || .0 || 2.5

See also
List of National Basketball Association career 3-point scoring leaders
List of National Basketball Association career playoff 3-point scoring leaders
List of National Basketball Association single-game steals leaders
List of National Basketball Association annual minutes leaders
List of National Basketball Association career minutes played leaders

References

External links

 at NBA.com

SI.com – Pro Basketball – Michael Finley Player Page

1973 births
2002 FIBA World Championship players
21st-century African-American sportspeople
20th-century African-American sportspeople
Living people
African-American basketball players
Film producers from Illinois
American men's basketball players
Basketball players from Illinois
Boston Celtics players
Competitors at the 1994 Goodwill Games
Dallas Mavericks players
National Basketball Association All-Stars
People from Melrose Park, Illinois
Phoenix Suns draft picks
Phoenix Suns players
San Antonio Spurs players
Shooting guards
Small forwards
Sportspeople from Maywood, Illinois
United States men's national basketball team players
Wisconsin Badgers men's basketball players
Universiade medalists in basketball
Universiade gold medalists for the United States
Goodwill Games medalists in basketball
Medalists at the 1993 Summer Universiade